The 2006–07 Eintracht Frankfurt season was the 107th season in the club's football history. In 2006–07 the club played in the Bundesliga, the first tier of German football. It was the club's 102nd season in the first tier.

Players

First-team squad
Squad at end of season

Left club during season

Eintracht Frankfurt II

Transfers 2006-07

In:

Out:

Results
Results for Eintracht Frankfurt for season 2006-2007.

'''NOTE: scores are written Eintracht first

Key:
BL = Bundesliga
GC = German Cup (DFB-Pokal)
UC = UEFA Cup match
F = Friendly match
IT = Indoor tournament

Notes

Sources

 Official English Eintracht website 
 Eintracht-Archiv.de
 2006–07 Eintracht Frankfurt season at Fussballdaten.de 

 

Eintracht Frankfurt seasons
Frankfurt, Eintracht